Daniel Tavares Martins (born 12 March 1996) is a Brazilian Paralympic athlete who competes in sprinting events at international elite events. He is a Paralympic champion, triple World champion and a Parapan American Games champion in the 400 metres T20 and he was the first Brazilian Paralympic athlete to do so in the T20 classification.

After winning his gold medal at the 2016 Summer Paralympics, a school in Ricardo de Albuquerque in the northern part of Rio de Janeiro was named in honour of him.

References

External links
 

1996 births
Living people
Brazilian male sprinters
Paralympic athletes of Brazil
Athletes (track and field) at the 2016 Summer Paralympics
Medalists at the 2016 Summer Paralympics
World Para Athletics Championships winners
Medalists at the 2019 Parapan American Games
People from Marília
People with epilepsy
Sportspeople from São Paulo (state)
21st-century Brazilian people